Nesareh-ye Kuchek (also Romanized as Nes̄āreh-ye Kūchek; also known as Nathārah, Nesāreh, Nes̄ār-e Kūchek, and Nos̄āreh) is a village in Darkhoveyn Rural District, in the Central District of Shadegan County, Khuzestan Province, Iran. At the 2006 census, its population was 204, in 43 families.

References 

Populated places in Shadegan County